James T. Harris III is the fourth president of the University of San Diego. Previously, he served as president of Widener University (2002-2015) and Defiance College (1994-2002), where he was named one of the top 50 character-building presidents in the United States by the John Templeton Foundation.

Career 
While Harris served at Defiance, the College received the largest gift in its history when the McMaster family gave Defiance $6 million to establish the McMaster School for the Advancement of Humanity. The College also achieved national recognition from U.S. News as one of the nation's top 25 service-learning schools during Harris' tenure. Harris was also Vice President at Wright State University in Dayton, Ohio, and the College of Mount St. Joseph in Cincinnati, Ohio. Harris started his career teaching social science at the Toledo Central Catholic High School.

Harris, a first-generation college student, received his D.Ed. from Pennsylvania State University in 1988. In 2003 he was named an alumni fellow by the alumni association and in 2013 a distinguished alumni by the university's board of trustees, the highest honor given a graduate of Penn State..  He has also received degrees from Edinboro University and the University of Toledo. Both Edinboro and Toledo have named him a distinguished alumni.

Harris is nationally recognized for his work in civic engagement. In 2011 he was awarded the Chief Executive leadership award by the Council for the Advancement and Support of Education. He has been elected to serve on multiple national and state boards holding many leadership positions including currently serving as treasurer and a member of the executive committee of the Council for the Advancement and Support of Education, and as a member of the steering committee of the National Anchor Institutions Task Force. Examples of leadership roles he held earlier in his career include being elected as the Chair of the Association of Independent Colleges and Universities of Pennsylvania, Chair of Pennsylvania Campus Compact and Vice Chair of the national Campus Compact Board. He also served as the Chair of the NCAA Division III President's Council. During his time on the NCAA board he was a member of the executive committee and was on the presidential search committee that hired current NCAA president Mark Emmert.

Harris has been a member of the MDP faculty at Harvard University since 2001. He is the author of multiple scholarly articles on higher education and in 2013 he co-authored a book on Academic Leadership and Governance published by Stylus.

Personal life 
Harris has been married to the former Mary Catherine Kurdila for over thirty years and they have two sons; Zachary and Braden. Harris is a Catholic.

Bibliography 
2005
 
2003
 
2002
  Note: Premium article requiring payment for full-text access

References 

Heads of universities and colleges in the United States
Widener University faculty
Wright State University
Mount St. Joseph University
University of Toledo alumni
Penn State College of Education alumni
Year of birth missing (living people)
Living people
Edinboro University of Pennsylvania alumni